Reel Stories, formerly Camp Reel Stories is a filmmaking program for girls and non-binary youth aged 12–19 years old. Reel Stories seeks to close a gender gap in the film industry and empower youth to create media in a supportive environment.

Summer Camp
Their summer camp takes place in both Oakland and Los Angeles. The camp is divided into a beginners camp and an advanced camp.

History
Reel Stories was founded in 2013 by Esther Pearl.

In 2021, Reel Stories merged with the Bay Area Video Coalition.

See also
 Women in film
 Bechdel test
 Reel Grrls
 Bay Area Video Coalition

References

External links 
Official website

Communications and media organizations based in the United States
Youth empowerment organizations
Women's empowerment
Organizations based in Oakland, California
Summer camps in California